Všemyslice is a municipality and village in České Budějovice District in the South Bohemian Region of the Czech Republic. It has about 1,100 inhabitants.

Administrative parts
Villages of Bohunice, Neznašov, Slavětice and Všeteč are administrative parts of Všemyslice.

References

Villages in České Budějovice District